Scores to settle is a 1998 Nigerian film about a widow who faces different struggles. It was directed by Chico Ejiro. The Nollywood film was released on 1 January 1998 by Great movies Ltd.

Cast 
Richard Mofe-Damijo
Liz Benson
Omotola Jalade 
Rich Azu
Teco Benson
Patrick Doyle

Synopsis 
Sade, a widow was chased out by her in-laws with two children, she had to struggle for survival on the street.

References 

1998 films
Nigerian drama films